Marchen is a Unicode block containing characters from the Marchen alphabet, which has been used to write the extinct Zhang-Zhung language of the Zhang-zhung culture of Tibet.  In modern Bon usage, Marchen is also used to write Tibetan.

History
The following Unicode-related documents record the purpose and process of defining specific characters in the Marchen block:

References 

Unicode blocks